In mathematics, the Suita conjecture is a conjecture related to the theory of the Riemann surface, the boundary behavior of conformal maps, the theory of Bergman kernel, and the theory of the L2 extension. The conjecture states the following:

Also, another proof of the Suita conjecture and 
The multi (high) - dimensional Suita conjecture fails in non-pseudoconvex domains. This conjecture was proved through the optimal estimation of the Ohsawa–Takegoshi L2 extension theorem.

Notes

Reference 

Several complex variables
Algebraic geometry